Eliahu Amiel (13 June 1925 – 2009) was an Israeli basketball player. He competed in the men's tournament at the 1952 Summer Olympics.

References

1925 births
2009 deaths
Israeli men's basketball players
Olympic basketball players of Israel
Basketball players at the 1952 Summer Olympics
Sportspeople from Alexandria
Egyptian emigrants to Israel
Israeli sports executives and administrators